For the other Bill Morgan, that played baseball around the same time, see Bill Morgan (outfielder/catcher)

William Morgan  (1856–1908) was a 19th-century professional baseball outfielder, shortstop and catcher.

External links

Major League Baseball outfielders
Major League Baseball shortstops
Major League Baseball catchers
Pittsburgh Alleghenys players
Washington Nationals (AA) players
19th-century baseball players
Baseball players from New York (state)
1856 births
1908 deaths
Brooklyn Grays (Interstate Association) players